The 1986 Giro d'Italia was the 69th running of the Giro d'Italia. The race started in Palermo, on 12 May, with a  prologue and concluded in Merano, on 2 June, with a  mass-start stage. A total of 171 riders from nineteen teams entered the 22-stage race, that was won by Italian Roberto Visentini of the  team. The second and third places were taken by Italian riders Giuseppe Saronni and Francesco Moser, respectively.

Swiss rider Urs Freuler was the first rider to wear the race leader's maglia rosa. The race lead was passed between five riders across the first five days of racing. Saronni gained the overall lead after the conclusion of the sixth stage and maintained an advantage through the fifteenth day of racing. As the race crossed several Alpine passes in the sixteenth stage, Visentini gained the race lead due to his strong performance on the stage. Visentini then defended the race lead until the race's conclusion on 2 June.

Amongst the other classifications that the race awarded, Guido Bontempi of  won the points classification, Pedro Muñoz of Fagor won the mountains classification, and Gis Gelati-Oece's Marco Giovannetti completed the Giro as the best neo-professional in the general classification, finishing eighth overall. Supermercati Brianzoli finishing as the winners of the team classification, ranking each of the twenty teams contesting the race by lowest cumulative time.

Teams

A total of nineteen teams were invited to participate in the 1986 Giro d'Italia. Each team sent a squad of nine riders, which meant that the race started with a peloton of 171 cyclists. The presentation of the teams – where each team's roster and manager are introduced in front the media and local dignitaries – took place at the Palazzo dei Normanni on 11 May. From the riders that began this edition, 143 made it to the finish in Merano.

The teams entering the race were:

Pre-race favorites

The starting peloton did not include the 1985 winner, Bernard Hinault. An El Mundo Deportivo writer believed LeMond, Moser, and Saronni to be the favorites to win the overall crown. In addition, the writer felt that Pedro Muñoz had the best chances to win the race, out of all the Spanish riders entering the event. Atala-Ofmega sports director Franco Criblori believed that Saronni's results would depend on what form he could maintain in the mountains. In addition, Criblori thought Dutchman Johan van der Velde and Swiss rider Niki Rüttimann were two foreigners to consider for a high place in the general classification.

Route and stages

The route for the 1986 edition of the Giro d'Italia was revealed to the public on television by head organizer Vincenzo Torriani on 8 February 1986. It contained four time trials, three of which were individual and one of which was a team event. There were twelve stages containing categorized climbs, of which three had summit finishes: stage 14, to Sauze d'Oulx; stage 16, to Foppolo; and stage 19, to Peio. The organizers chose to include no rest days. Torriani did not want to interfere with the World Cup being held in Mexico. When compared to the previous year's race, the race was  shorter, contained two less rest days, and the same number of time trials. In addition, this race contained the same number of stages, but one less set of half stages.

l'Unita writer Gino Sala believed the route to be more challenging than the routes within the past few years. He criticized the route for the stage three team time trial for going over dangerous roads. Author Bill McGann believed Torriani designed the route to be relatively flat in order to increase the likelihood of Italian riders Giuseppe Saronni and Francesco Moser winning the race. Five-time champion Eddy Merckx believed the route to be "decapitated."

Race overview

The Giro began with a  prologue that navigated through the streets of Palermo, which was won by Urs Freuler by one second over the second-placed finisher. Later that day, the first mass-start stage was raced. Shortly after the stage, he fell into a coma, only to die two weeks later. Sergio Santimaria won the stage through a field sprint, and, with the time bonus, he earned race leader's maglia rosa. Stage 2 also culminated with a bunch sprint where Skala-Skil's Jean-Paul van Poppel took the lead with  left and held on to win, as well as take the overall lead. The third stage was a team time trial that traveled around Sicily. Del Tongo-Colnago won the time trial by nine seconds over Supermercati Brianzoli-Essebi, which put their rider Giuseppe Saronni into the pink jersey. Gianbattista Baronchelli rode away on a climb late into the fourth stage and rode by himself to victory, earning the race lead in the process. American Greg LeMond won the fifth stage after attacking a few kilometers from the finish. Saronni led the peloton across the finish line two seconds after LeMond crossed the finish line.

In the race's sixth stage, Roberto Visentini won the leg after attacking a few kilometers from the finish. Saronni regained the race lead after finishing second on the stage and earning a fifteen-second time bonus. The next two stages both resulted in a bunch sprint, with Guido Bontempi winning stage 7 and Franco Chioccioli, stage 8. The ninth stage contained the climbs of Monte Terminillo and La Forca and was considered one of the tougher stages in the race. Malvor-Bottecchia-Vaporella rider Acácio da Silva won the stage as the top of the general classification rankings remained unchanged from the previous days.

The twelfth stage of the race was a  individual time trial that stretched from Sinalunga to Siena. Lech Piasecki of Del Tongo-Colnago won the stage and was one of five riders to complete the course in under an hour. Due to his strong time on the stage, Saronni increased his advantage over all of his rivals except for Visentini who finished quicker. The next day of racing saw several breakaway groups try to form, but all with no success as the main field finished the stage together with a field sprint that was won by van Poppel. The race's fourteenth stage saw the race head back into the mountains, with a summit finish to Sauze d'Oulx. As the peloton made its way up the final climb, Pedro Muñoz, Martin Earley, and Stefano Giuliani formed a breakaway group out in front. With about three kilometers left in the stage, Earley attacked and went on to win the stage after riding by himself for the remainder of the stage. Dag Erik Pedersen won the next stage through a bunch sprint.

The sixteenth stage saw the race travel across several mountain passes in the Alps, with Muñoz winning the stage after attacking on the day's final climb of the day. Visentini, who finished third on the stage, gained enough time on Saronni to take the overall lead from him by over a minute. Bontempi won his fourth stage of the race after out-sprinting the rest of the peloton for the victory the day after. Francesco Moser won the stage by forty-nine seconds over the second placed rider and his time, when coupled with the performance of the other riders, moved him into third overall.  rider Johan van der Velde won the next leg of the race after attacking on a descent before the stage's final climb to Peio.

The twentieth stage of the race came down to a field sprint that was won by Bontempi. The penultimate stage of the race traversed several mountain passes in the Dolomites. Four riders escaped off the front of the peloton, meanwhile the general classification contenders remained together behind the leading group. As the leading group neared the finish, da Silva attacked and went on to win the stage by seven seconds. The general classification contenders finished together, despite attacks from LeMond. Belgian Eric Van Lancker won the leg by means of a bunch sprint.

Three riders achieved multiple stage victories: Bontempi (stages 7, 10, 11, 17, and 20), da Silva (stages 9 and 21), and van Poppel (stages 2 and 13). Stage wins were achieved by eleven of the nineteen competing squads, eight of which won multiple stages. Carrera-Vagabond collected a total of six stage wins through two riders, Bontempi and Visentini (stage 6). Del Tongo-Colnago amassed a total of two stage victories through the team time trial and Piasecki (stage 12). Skala-Skil also collected two stage successes with van Poppel. Ariostea–Gres achieved the same feat with individual stage wins from Santimaria (stage 1) and Pedersen (stage 15). Fagor also secured two stage wins through Earley (stage 14) and Muñoz (stage 16). Supermercati Brianzoli-Essebi obtained two stage victories with Baronchelli (stage 4) and Moser (stage 18). Malvor-Bottecchia-Vaporella also collected two stage successes with da Silva. Panasonic-Merckx-Agu recorded two stage victories with van der Velde (stage 19) and Van Lancker (stage 22). Atala-Ofmega, La Vie Claire, and Ecoflam-Jollyscarpe-BFB Bruc. all won a single stage at the Giro, the first through Freuler (prologue), the second through LeMond (stage 5), and the third by Chioccioli (stage 8).

Classification leadership

Four different jerseys were worn during the 1986 Giro d'Italia. The leader of the general classification – calculated by adding the stage finish times of each rider, and allowing time bonuses for the first three finishers on mass-start stages – wore a pink jersey. This classification is the most important of the race, and its winner is considered as the winner of the Giro.

For the points classification, which awarded a purple (or cyclamen) jersey to its leader, cyclists were given points for finishing a stage in the top 15; additional points could also be won in intermediate sprints. The green jersey was awarded to the mountains classification leader. In this ranking, points were won by reaching the summit of a climb ahead of other cyclists. Each climb was ranked as either first, second or third category (first being the highest), with more points available for higher category climbs. The Cima Coppi, the race's highest point of elevation, awarded more points than the other first category climbs. The Cima Coppi for this Giro was the Passo Pordoi. The first rider to cross the Pordoi Pass was Spanish rider Pedro Muñoz. The white jersey was worn by the leader of young rider classification, a ranking decided the same way as the general classification, but considering only neo-professional cyclists (in their first three years of professional racing). Although no jersey was awarded, there was also one classification for the teams, in which the stage finish times of the best three cyclists per team were added; the leading team was the one with the lowest total time.

The rows in the following table correspond to the jerseys awarded after that stage was run.

Final standings

General classification

Points classification

Mountains classification

Young rider classification

Team classification

Combination classification

Premio dell'Agonismo classification

Traguardi fiat uno classification

Trofeo del 90 anni classification

References

 
1986
Giro d'Italia, 1986
Giro d'Italia, 1986
May 1986 sports events in Europe
June 1986 sports events in Europe
1986 Super Prestige Pernod International